Sir George John Robert Murray  (27 September 1863 – 18 February 1942) was a judge from 2 April 1913 until 18 February 1942 on the Supreme Court of South Australia, which is the highest ranking court in the Australian State of South Australia. He was Chief Judge from 20 January 1916 until 18 February 1942.

Early life

George John Robert Murray was born at Murray Park, Magill, near Adelaide, the second surviving son of Alexander Borthwick Murray, a pioneer sheep-breeder and South Australia politician, and his second wife Margaret, née Tinline. George Murray and was first educated at John L. Young's Adelaide Educational Institution, then two years at the Royal High School, Edinburgh and St Peter's College, Adelaide, where he won the Prankerd, Wyatt, Christchurch and Farrell scholarships. At the University of Adelaide Murray won the John Howard Clark scholarship for English literature in 1882, qualified for the BA degree in 1883, and won the South Australian Scholarship. This allowed him to study at the University of Cambridge where he took his B.A. and LL.B. degrees, being bracketed senior in the law tripos in 1887.
Murray also represented Cambridge in cricket and rowing.

Career

Legal

Murray was called to the bar at the Inner Temple in 1888, returned to South Australia and was associate to Sir Samuel Way until 1891, when he began practising as a barrister, initially in partnership with William Ashley Magarey as Murray & Magarey. He was soon successful, and in 1906 became a KC, the first Adelaide graduate to obtain this distinction. In 1909 he paid a visit to England and took his LL.M. degree, and in 1912 he was appointed a judge of the Supreme Court of South Australia.

In 1916 he succeeded Sir Samuel Way as Chief Justice of South Australia. He was held in high regard by the legal profession.

University of Adelaide
He had been on the council of the University of Adelaide since 1891, and in 1915 was appointed vice-chancellor and in 1916 became chancellor of the university.

His interest in educational problems and the university was shown in many ways, and his benefactions included £1000 for the building fund of the university in 1920, £2000 for general purposes in 1931, and £10,000 for a men's union building in 1936. He renounced his life interest in the estate of his sister, the value of which was estimated at £45,000, and this was left to the university in 1936.

Lieutenant Governor of South Australia
As Lieutenant Governor of South Australia for practically the whole period of his chief justiceship, Murray administered the government of South Australia on numerous occasions in the absence of the Governor.

Honours, later life, death and legacy

Murray was created K.C.M.G. in 1917.

Murray visited Europe again in 1935. He died at Adelaide following an operation for appendicitis on 18 February 1942; he was buried privately beside his sister in St George's Church of England cemetery, Magill.

In 1908 he endowed the University of Adelaide with £1,000 to establish the Tinline Scholarship in History in recognition of the family of his mother, born Margaret Tinline (c. 1823 – 17 August 1907).

The heritage-listed George Murray Building, part of the Union Buildings at the university, designed by Woods, Bagot, Jory and Laybourne-Smith and built in 1937, was named after him.

Every year at St. Peter's College the house with the highest performance and effort in house events is awarded the George Murray Shield.

References

 
 Emerson, Dr. John, First Among Equals – Chief Justices of South Australia Since Federation, University of Adelaide Barr Smith Press, Adelaide, 2004, pp 57–108.

External links
 Supreme Court History courts.sa.gov.au

1863 births
1942 deaths
Chief Justices of South Australia
Australian Knights Commander of the Order of St Michael and St George
People from Adelaide
People educated at Adelaide Educational Institution
People educated at the Royal High School, Edinburgh
People educated at St Peter's College, Adelaide
University of Adelaide alumni
Alumni of Trinity College, Cambridge
Members of the Inner Temple
Chancellors of the University of Adelaide
Vice-Chancellors of the University of Adelaide
Lieutenant-Governors of South Australia
Australian King's Counsel
Judges of the Supreme Court of South Australia
20th-century Australian judges